The Talimena Scenic Drive is a National Scenic Byway in southeastern Oklahoma and extreme western Arkansas spanning a  stretch of Oklahoma State Highway 1 (SH-1) and Arkansas Highway 88 (AR 88) from Talihina, Oklahoma, to Mena, Arkansas.

Route description

Designated a National Scenic Byway by the America's Byway Program in 2005, the road travels within the Ouachita National Forest along the highest peaks of the Winding Stair Mountains, part of the Ouachita Mountain chain, including the second tallest peak in Arkansas, Rich Mountain,  in elevation.  Many of the forests along these ridges, stunted and of little commercial value, were never logged and are old growth.  The two-lane road features hiking trails beginning at various points along its stretch and 22 scenic vista pull-outs. There are at least 13% hill grades along the route.

History
The current route opened in 1969 and formed a stretch of what would become Oklahoma State Highway 1. In this case, the number 1 was assigned due to the scenery along the highway. It was dedicated on June 7, 1970 by Lucy Baines Johnson-Nugent, the daughter of U.S. president Lyndon B. Johnson.

The roadway was designated as a National Forest Scenic Byway on February 8, 1989. It was later made an Arkansas State Scenic Byway on January 7, 1998, and an Oklahoma State Scenic Byway on October 10, 2002. The National Scenic Byway status was conferred on  September 22, 2005.

References

External links

Talimena Scenic Drive Association
Twisties of the Talimena Drive

Protected areas of the U.S. Interior Highlands
Arkansas Scenic Byways
Roads in Oklahoma
National Scenic Byways
National Forest Scenic Byways
Ouachita National Forest
1969 establishments in Arkansas
1969 establishments in Oklahoma